The Lives of Famous Men is an American rock band that formed in the Fall of 2006 in Portland, Oregon, each member hailing from Anchorage, Alaska.  The band takes its name from the title of a poem by Jack Gilbert.

History
The Lives of Famous Men began rehearsing together in the Fall of 2006.  In the Spring of 2007, they recorded an EP entitled Rehearsal in Hillsboro, Oregon, and after playing a few shows in Portland, started their first national tour supporting Youinseries and National Product.  At the end of the summer, they returned to their hometown of Anchorage, Alaska to play three shows with Shiny Toy Guns.  That fall, during a three-week stop in the middle of another cross-country outing, they recorded their second EP Modern Love, The Wooden Vehicle with producer James Paul Wisner (Dashboard Confessional, Paramore) in St. Cloud, FL.

The Lives of Famous Men began their 2008 touring with five dates at the SXSW Music Festival in Austin, TX, playing shows with The Working Title, Danger Radio, The Summer Set, and Anarbor.  Shortly after, they toured the Western states with Lakes and the South and Midwest with Chase Pagan.  In May, they played the Philadelphia date of the MTVu Campus Invasion Festival, opening for Wyclef Jean, Cobra Starship, All Time Low, and The Spill Canvas.  At the beginning of the summer, they again returned to Alaska for two shows with Motion City Soundtrack and an annual festival featuring Poison The Well and MXPX Called Summer Meltdown.  During the remainder of the Summer they toured the West and Midwest with A Thorn For Every Heart and on There Came a Tour with Ivoryline, There For Tomorrow, and In:aviate.  In the fall, they joined the first leg of a national tour with A Cursive Memory, A Rocket to the Moon, Brighten, and The Urgency.  The Lives of Famous Men have also played scattered shows with Dear and the Headlights, National Product, Vedera, Every Avenue, The Maine, Weatherbox, Jet Lag Gemini, One Small Step For Landmines, Self Against City, We Shot the Moon, Thieves and Villains, A Change of Pace, Houston Calls, The Hush Sound, and School Boy Humor.

In late December, The Lives of Famous Men released the song Sunshine as a digital single.  The song - which had already become a popular staple in their live set - was recorded in Seattle, WA with producer Casey Bates (Forgive Durden, Portugal. The Man).  According to the band's myspace page, they will be co-heading tours in January with Anarbor and Go Crash Audio.

In September they were featured on Jimmy Kimmel Live! after winning a contest.
They performed the song "You're Everyone I Know Right Now".

They also got a "little blurb in the November issue" of Spin Magazine.

In December they are planning to release The Sunshine(EP).they have also played with[portugal. The man

Members
Daniel Hall: Vocals
Ari Katcher: Guitar
Dylan Mandel: Drums/percussion,
Andrew Totemoff: Bass
Jason Wahto: Keys/programming

Discography

Albums/EPs

References
Alternative Press Magazine’s AP&R column (issue #232, Nov. 2007)
Absolute Punk Album Review
Big Smile Magazine Interview
The Daily Chorus Album Review

Rock music groups from Oregon
Musical groups from Portland, Oregon
Musical groups established in 2006